Rockin' with Wanda is a compilation album by country music and rockabilly singer Wanda Jackson. It was released in 1960 by Capitol Records (catalog no. T-1384). The album cover calls it "a collection of great country songs in the rhythmic singing style of Wanda Jackson."

AllMusic gave the album a rating of four-and-a-half stars. Reviewer Richie Unterberger called it "absolutely the best collection of Wanda Jackson's rockabilly recordings" and "a leading candidate for the best female rock & roll album of the 1950s."

Track listing
Side A
 "Rock Your Baby" (Wanda Jackson) [1:43]
 "Fujiyama Mama" (Earl Burrows) [2:11]
 "You're the One for Me"  (Steve Rowland) [1:58]
 "Did You Miss Me?" (Bobby Lord) [2:16]
 "Cool Love" (Vicki Countryman, Wanda Jackson) [2:17]
 "Honey Bop" (Mae Boren Axton, Tommy Durden, Glenn Reeves) [2:14]

Side B
 "Hot Dog! That Made Him Mad" (Danny Barker, Don Raye) [2:40]
 "Baby Loves Him" (Wanda Jackson) [2:02]
 "Mean Mean Man" (Wanda Jackson) [2:13]
 "You've Turned to a Stranger' (Freddy Franks, Jack Rhodes) [2:43]
 "Don'a Wan'a" (Boudleaux Bryant) [2:15]
 I Gotta Know" (Matt Williams, Paul Evans) [2:30]

Bonus tracks on CD
A later reissue of the album for compact disc included six bonus tracks:
 "(Everytime They Play) Our Song" (Howard Thomas, Rachel Lane) [2:03]
 "Sinful Heart" (Wanda Jackson) [2:38]
 "Savin' My Love" (Wanda Jackson) [2:09]
 "A Date with Jerry" (Cindy Walker) [2:16]
 "Reaching" (Skeets McDonald) [2:22]
 "Id Rather Have You" (Thelma Blackmon) 2:33

References

1960 albums
Wanda Jackson compilation albums
Capitol Records albums